Gradac is a village in Požega-Slavonia County, Croatia. The village is administered as a part of the City of Pleternica.
According to national census of 2001, population of the village is 1,090.

Sources

Populated places in Požega-Slavonia County